WWWI-FM (95.9 FM, "Cash 95") is a radio station licensed to Pillager, Minnesota, and serving the Brainerd Lakes Area. The station is owned by Jimmy D. Birkemeyer's R & J Broadcasting. Its sister station is WWWI (1270 AM), which airs a news/talk format.

It airs a hybrid country music/adult standards format. and gets network news from CBS Radio.

The station was assigned the WWWI-FM call letters by the Federal Communications Commission on July 1, 2004.

History

It was announced in July 2012 that Red Rock Radio was buying the AM/FM combo from Tower Broadcasting Corporation, pending FCC approval. The purchase was consummated on October 31, 2012, at a purchase price of $700,000.

On September 1, 2013 WWWI-FM split from its simulcast with WWWI AM 1270 and switched to a classic rock format.

On September 23, 2014 it was announced WWWI-FM will join one of 6 stations in a simulcast of KQDS-FM, which also has a classic rock format, effective October 6.

On September 16, 2016, Red Rock Radio announced that it would sell WWWI-FM to R & J Broadcasting as part of an eight station deal; the sale was completed on December 21, 2016. On November 1, 2016 WWWI-FM changed their format from classic rock to country/adult standards.

Honors and awards
In February 2006, station co-owner Mary Pryor was awarded the Marine Corps League Distinguished Citizen Award for her support of the annual Toys for Kids program. The award by the Heartland Detachment of the Marine Corps League and the Heartland Auxiliary Unit, which sponsor Toys for Kids. (The "Toys for Kids" program is independent of the national Toys for Tots program.) This was the first time the award had been presented to a civilian in the Brainerd area.

References

External links

Radio stations in Minnesota
Country radio stations in the United States
Cass County, Minnesota
Radio stations established in 1998
1998 establishments in Minnesota